The 2016–17 Adelaide Strikers WBBL season was the second in the team's history. Coached by Andrea McCauley and captained by Tegan McPharlin, the team competed in the WBBL02 tournament.

At the conclusion of the group stage, the Strikers team was last on the table, and therefore did not qualify for the knockout phase.

Squad
The following is the Strikers women squad for WBBL|02.  Players with international caps are listed in bold.

Sources

Ladder

Fixtures

Group stage

References

2016–17 Women's Big Bash League season by team
Adelaide Strikers (WBBL)